Estadio Metropolitano (Metropolitan Stadium) may refer to:

 Estadio Metropolitano Roberto Meléndez, Barranquilla, Colombia
 Estadio Metropolitano de San Cristóbal, a multi-use stadium in San Cristóbal, Venezuela
 Estadio Metropolitano de Madrid, former home stadium of Atlético Madrid, used 1923–1966
 Estadio Metropolitano de Mérida, a football stadium in Mérida, Venezuela
 Estadio Metropolitano de Techo, a multi-use stadium in Bogotá, Colombia
 Estadio Olímpico Metropolitano, a multi-purpose stadium in San Pedro Sula, Honduras
 Estadio Metropolitano Ciudad de Itagüí, a multi-use stadium in Itagüí, Colombia
 Estadio Monumental de Maturín, the largest stadium in Venezuela
 Estadio Metropolitano de Fútbol de Lara, a football stadium in Cabudare, Venezuela
 Metropolitano Stadium, the current home stadium of Atlético Madrid, used since 2017
 Estadio Metropolitano (Madrid Metro), a station on Line 7